The Fountain of Neptune (Italian: Fontana del Nettuno) is the name of several fountains in the world:

Neptunbrunnen (Neptune fountain) in Berlin, Germany.
Fountain of Neptune, Bologna, by Giambologna
Fountain of Neptune, Florence, by Bartolommeo Ammanati located in the central Piazza della Signoria
Neptune's Fountain, Gdańsk
Fountain of Neptune, Madrid
Fountain of Neptune, Messina by Giovanni Angelo Montorsoli
Fountain of Neptune, Naples
Fountain of Neptune, Rome, located in Piazza Navona (another is in Piazza del Popolo)
Trevi Fountain, Rome features Neptune in central Exedrae
Fountain of Neptune, Santiago de Chile
Fountain of Neptune, Trento
Fountain of Neptune, located on the Schönbrunn Palace grounds, Vienna